Plasmodium incertae is a parasite of the genus Plasmodium, subgenus Vinckeia. As in all Plasmodium species, P. incertae has both vertebrate and insect hosts. The vertebrate hosts for this parasite are mammals.

Distribution 
This species occurs in Asia.

Vectors
Not known.

Hosts 
This species infects Asian flying squirrels.

References 

incertae